Gold in New Frisco is a 1939 German adventure film directed by Paul Verhoeven and starring Hans Söhnker, Alexander Golling, and Otto Wernicke. It was one of a number of western-themed films made in Germany during the late 1930s including Sergeant Berry, Water for Canitoga, and The Kaiser of California. It was popular enough to be rereleased in 1949.

It was shot at the Bavaria Studios in Munich. The film's sets were designed by the art director Wilhelm Depenau and Ludwig Reiber.

Cast

References

Bibliography

External links 
 

1939 films
1939 Western (genre) films
German Western (genre) films
Films of Nazi Germany
1930s German-language films
Films directed by Paul Verhoeven (Germany)
Films shot at Bavaria Studios
Bavaria Film films
Films set in Alberta
German black-and-white films
1930s German films